The Public Laboratory for Open Technology and Science (Public Lab) is a non-profit organization that facilitates collaborative, open source environmental research in a model known as Community Science. It supports communities facing environmental justice issues in a do it yourself approach to environmental monitoring and advocacy. Public Lab grew out of a grassroots effort to take aerial photographs of the BP Oil Spill in the Gulf of Mexico in 2010. Since then, they have launched a range of projects, including an open source spectrometer, multi-spectral camera, and low-cost microscope.

Balloon Mapping 

The aerial photography technique Public Lab is best known for involves lifting cameras above an area using tethered helium-filled weather balloons.

Open source environmental monitoring 
Public Lab's community develops open source hardware, software, and other open methodologies to democratize environmental monitoring. Recognizing that cost, complexity, and lack of access can prevent communities from playing an active role in documenting environmental problems, the community publishes plans and guides for Do It Yourself monitoring projects that can be made at home.

References

Citizen science
Environmental organizations based in the United States